Melvin Merritt Spence (May 9, 1927 – June 28, 2014) was an American politician who served as a member of the Virginia House of Delegates from 1982 to 1983. Elected in 1981, he had to run for reelection the next year after a three-judge panel of the United States District Court for the Eastern District of Virginia found the state's multi-member districts to violated the equal protection clause. He was defeated in the newly-drawn 81st district by Owen B. Pickett.

References

External links
 
 

1927 births
2014 deaths
Republican Party members of the Virginia House of Delegates
Virginia Tech alumni